Agat is a village in Ayeyarwady Division, Burma.

References

Populated places in Ayeyarwady Region